Ronald Edward Bertram (22 June 1924 – 17 November 2014) was an Australian lawyer and politician who was a Labor Party member of the Legislative Assembly of Western Australia from 1968 to 1989. He briefly served as a minister in the government of John Tonkin.

Bertram was born in Perth to Maude (née Bennett) and Walter Bertram. He enlisted in the Australian Imperial Force in June 1943, and saw service in New Guinea during the war. Bertram was discharged from the army in 1946, and subsequently worked as an accountant. He later studied law part-time, and was called to the bar in 1954, allowing him to practise as a barrister. Bertram first ran for parliament at the 1965 state election. He contested the newly created North Metropolitan Province, but was defeated by Arthur Griffith of the Liberal Party. Bertram eventually entered parliament at the 1968 state election, replacing the retiring Bill Hegney in the seat of Mount Hawthorn.

Bertram was re-elected at the 1971 state election, which saw a Labor victory, and was then appointed Attorney-General and Minister for Railways in the new ministry formed by John Tonkin. However, he resigned from cabinet after just under seven months in office, due to ill health. He was the shortest-serving state attorney-general since Frederick Moorhead in 1901. Following Labor's defeat at the 1974 state election, Bertram was included in Labor's Tonkin shadow cabinet. He remained a member until 1980, serving under three leaders of the opposition (John Tonkin, Colin Jamieson, and Ron Davies). At the 1983 election, the seat of Mount Hawthorn was abolished, and Bertram successfully transferred to the seat of Balcatta, which he held until his retirement at the 1989 election. He died in Perth in November 2014, aged 90.

References

|-

|-

1924 births
2014 deaths
Attorneys-General of Western Australia
Australian Army soldiers
Australian barristers
Australian Labor Party members of the Parliament of Western Australia
Australian Army personnel of World War II
Members of the Western Australian Legislative Assembly
Politicians from Perth, Western Australia